Monticello Central School District (MCSD) is a school district headquartered in Monticello, New York.

Schools
Secondary:
 Monticello High School
 Robert J. Kaiser Middle School
Primary:
 Emma C. Chase Elementary School
 George L. Cooke Elementary School
 Kenneth L. Rutherford Elementary School
Preschool:
 Project Excel Preschool

References

External links
 

School districts in New York (state)
Education in Sullivan County, New York